Ketkar or Ketakar may refer to:

 Shridhar Venkatesh Ketkar, a scholar of the Marathi language
 Tejashree Pradhan Ketkar (born 1988), Marathi television and film actress
 Venkatesh P. Ketakar, an astronomer who in 1911 proposed the existence of a trans-Neptunian planet, now disproven
 Katkar, a census town in Thane district in the Indian state of Maharashtra